Events during the year 2020 in Italy.

Incumbents

 President: Sergio Mattarella
 Prime Minister: Giuseppe Conte

Events

January 
26 January – 
2020 Calabrian regional election.
2020 Emilia-Romagna regional election.

 31 January - first cases of coronavirus in Italy, these are 2 Chinese tourists.

February 
12 February – Italy's Senate has voted to allow prosecutors to put Matteo Salvini on trial over charges of holding migrants at sea.

21 February-COVID-19 pandemic in Italy, the first outbreak breaks out in Codogno in Lombardy, 14 confirmed cases.

March 
 4 March - the first minister Giuseppe Conte signs the decree to close all schools nationwide, and activate a massive lockdown in northern Italy.

 8 March - the prime minister, signs the decree that imposes the national lockdown, all work and teaching activities will be suspended until May 4 throughout the country.

May 
19 May - it was supposed to be the day of the return to school, the government postponed the opening directly to September in the new school year.

September 
17 September- after the United States, Canada, the rest of Europe and China, the Nintendo 3DS together with the 2DS, 3DS XL, New 3DS, New 3DS XL and New 2DS XL versions closes the supports in Italy. Thus putting an end to the era of 3DS in the Italian videogame market.
20 September- 2020 Campania regional election, Vincenzo De Luca is elected as president of the Campania region.

October 
 26 October - a violent protest takes place in Naples in which Camorra and far-right groups take part, against the closures brought by the government of the campania region.

Sports
January – 2019–20 Tour de Ski

February 
22 February - some games played in the north are postponed due to the covid.  subsequently they will be recovered the following week.  will be the last games before the lockdown.

March 
9 March - after the match Sassuolo-brescia, all sporting activities of every series and every sport will be suspended for health reasons.

May 
 2 May - the Italian basketball championship is officially ended due to the covid pandemic, virtus Bologna becomes champion of Italy at the table.

June
20 June - the Italian football championship, the Serie A resumes after the 2-month stop due to the lockdown, the championship will end on August 2 won by Juventus, it will become the longest championship in the history of Italian football.

Deaths

January
3 January – Domenico Corcione, general, Minister of Defence (b. 1929)
4 January –
Emilio Giletti, racing driver (b. 1929)
Lorenza Mazzetti, film director (b. 1927)
7 January – Vincenzo Cerundolo, medical researcher (b. 1959)
10 January – Guido Messina, racing cyclist (b. 1931)

February
1 February –
Luciano Gaucci, football executive (b. 1938)
Luciano Ricceri, production designer (b. 1940)
9 February – Mirella Freni, operatic soprano (b. 1935)

March
3 March – Mother Tekla Famiglietti, nun (b. 1936)
5 March – Antonio Nardini, historian and author (b. 1922)
9 March – Italo De Zan, cyclist (b. 1925)
10 March – Alessandro Criscuolo, jurist (b. 1937)
11 March – Stefano Bianco, Italian motorcycle racer (b. 1985)
12 March – Giovanni Battista Rabino, politician (b. 1931)
14 March – Piero Schlesinger, jurist and banker (b. 1930)
15 March – Vittorio Gregotti, architect (b. 1927)
16 March –
Sergio Bassi, singer-songwriter (b. 1951)
Francesco Saverio Pavone, magistrate (b. 1944)
18 March – Luciano Federici, footballer (b. 1938)
19 March –
Innocenzo Donina, footballer (b. 1950)
Antonio Michele Stanca, geneticist (b. 1942)
20 March – Marino Quaresimin, politician (b. 1937)
24 March – Lorenzo Acquarone, lawyer and politician (b. 1931)

April
17 April – Giuseppe Guarino, scholar and politician (born 1922)
26 April – Giulietto Chiesa, journalist and politician (b. 1940)

May
15 May – Ezio Bosso, composer, classical musician and conductor (b. 1971)

June
Marcello Abbado, composer and pianist (b. 1926)

July
26 July – Claudia Giannotti, actress (b. 1937).
27 July – Gianrico Tedeschi, actor (b. 1920).

November
2 November – Gigi Proietti, actor, comedian (b. 1940)
11 November – Giuliana Minuzzo, alpine skier (b. 1931)

See also

Country overviews
 Italy
 History of Italy
 History of modern Italy
 Outline of Italy
 Government of Italy
 Politics of Italy
 Years in Italy
 Timeline of Italy history

Related timelines for current period
 2020
 2020 in politics and government
 2020s

References 

 
2020s in Italy
Years of the 21st century in Italy
Italy
Italy